Nina Žabjek  (born 4 March 1998) is a Slovenian handball player for RK Krim and the Slovenian national team.

She was selected to represent Slovenia at the 2017 World Women's Handball Championship.

References

External links

1998 births
Living people
Handball players from Ljubljana
Slovenian female handball players